Tölömüsh Okeyevich Okeyev (11 September 1935 – 18 December 2001) was a Kyrgyz screenwriter and film director born in Bokonbayevskoye. In 1973, he was a member of the jury at the 8th Moscow International Film Festival. His 1975 film, The Red Apple, was entered into the 9th Moscow International Film Festival while his 1984 film, The Descendant of the Snow Leopard, was entered into the 35th Berlin International Film Festival, where it won the Silver Bear for an outstanding single achievement. In 1999, he was a member of the jury at the 21st Moscow International Film Festival.

Filmography

Directed films
 Genghis Khan (1992)
Miracle of Love (Сүйүүнүн Көркү, 1986)
The Descendant of the Snow Leopard (Ак илбирсти тукуму, 1984)
Skulptor Olga Manuylova (1982)
Golden Autumn (Алтын Күз, 1980)
Ulan (1977)
The Red Apple (1975)
The Ferocious One (1974)
The Worship of Fire (1971-2; sometimes Bow Down to the Fire), a biography of Urkuya Salieva
Smarter Birds (1970)
The Heritage (1969)
The Skies of Our Childhood (1966)
There Are Horses (1965)

Written films
Spotted Dog Running at the Edge of the Sea (1990)

References

External links

1935 births
2001 deaths
Kyrgyzstani screenwriters
Kyrgyzstani film directors
Soviet film directors
Soviet screenwriters
Male screenwriters
High Courses for Scriptwriters and Film Directors alumni
People from Issyk-Kul Region
20th-century screenwriters